The 1949 Newfoundland general election was held on 27 May 1949 to elect members of the 29th General Assembly of Newfoundland. It was the first general election held since Newfoundland joined Canadian confederation on 31 March 1949 and the first Newfoundland-wide election of any kind since the suspension of responsible government and the creation of the Commission of Government in 1934. The election was won by the Liberal Party.

Joey Smallwood was invited to form an interim administration when Newfoundland became a part of Canada just before midnight on March 31, 1949.  This interim Smallwood administration continued until the results of the May election.

The election was held under the House of Assembly Act of 1932, with the same 27 seats, plus a new seat for Labrador, though the election in the Labrador seat was deferred until July 25. The five seats where Progressive Conservatives won had all voted heavily against confederation in the 1948 Newfoundland referendums.

Results by district

References
 

Elections in Newfoundland and Labrador
Newfoundland general election
General election
Newfoundland general election
Newfoundland general election